James Garvin Stewart (born 9 March 1954) is a Scottish former football goalkeeper.

Football career

Playing
He began his career with local side Troon, and he went on to play for Kilmarnock, Middlesbrough, Rangers, St Mirren and Partick Thistle. Stewart earned 2 caps for Scotland and was included in the squad at the 1974 FIFA World Cup.

Coaching
He was later the goalkeeping coach at Kilmarnock and Heart of Midlothian, who he left to rejoin Rangers in August 2007. He worked with the SFA as a youth goalkeeping coach before joined the Scotland national football team setup under Gordon Strachan in 2013, on a part-time basis. Stewart left Rangers in March 2017, following the appointment of Pedro Caixinha as team manager. He was then the goalkeeping coach at Nottingham Forest from May 2017 to January 2018.

Personal life
His son Colin also played as a goalkeeper for Kilmarnock, and daughter-in-law Julie Fleeting is the all-time leading scorer for the Scotland women's national football team.

References

External links 
 
 

1954 births
1974 FIFA World Cup players
Association football goalkeepers
Dumbarton F.C. players
Kilmarnock F.C. players
Living people
Middlesbrough F.C. players
Partick Thistle F.C. players
Rangers F.C. non-playing staff
Rangers F.C. players
Troon F.C. players
Scotland international footballers
Scotland under-21 international footballers
Scotland under-23 international footballers
Scottish Football League players
Scottish Football League representative players
Scottish footballers
St Mirren F.C. players
English Football League players
Nottingham Forest F.C. non-playing staff